The 2007–08 Northern Football League season was the 110th in the history of Northern Football League, a football competition in England.

Division One

Division One featured 19 clubs which competed in the division last season, along with three new clubs, promoted from Division Two:
 Seaham Red Star
 Spennymoor Town
 Washington

Also, Dunston Federation Brewery changed name to Dunston Federation, while Newcastle Benfield (Bay Plastics) changed name to Newcastle Benfield.

League table

Division Two

Division Two featured 17 clubs which competed in the division last season, along with three new clubs:
 Birtley Town, promoted from the Wearside Football League
 Darlington Railway Athletic, relegated from Division One
 Horden Colliery Welfare, relegated from Division One

Also, Penrith changed name to Penrith Town.

League table

References

External links
 Northern Football League official site

Northern Football League seasons
9